Night Is Day is a 2012 independent feature film shot in Glasgow, Scotland. It follows the adventures of Jason Mackenzie, a 20-something year old superpowered vigilante with the power of lightning and the gift of foresight. In Night Is Day, Jason has to fight both natural and supernatural villains with the assistance of the police, in order to save Lena Dwyre, a medical student at Glasgow University.

The story takes place over three days and was filmed mostly in Glasgow and Falkirk, Scotland on a micro-budget. It was written and directed by Fraser Coull of Silly Wee Films and produced by GoldRay Productions with support from FK One Productions and Artist Media Ltd. Night Is Day features a local cast but also features special guest appearances from minor local celebrities such as Elaine C. Smith, Colin McCredie, Simon Weir, Tiger Tim Stevens, and Lynne Hogan from Real Radio.

Plot 
Jason Mackenzie was a normal young Glaswegian until he was mysteriously bestowed with supernatural powers. Now he has the ability to see into the future of anyone he touches, as well as the ability to generate electricity, creating lightning bolts as he fights crime.

Superintendent Charles Sloan of F-division, a special team that keeps the truth about monsters and demons from reaching the population, knows first-hand of Jason’s abilities. His team consists of Detective Inspector Iain Mullan, a rough and ready cop, and Inspector Rebecca Munro.

The Cailleach, an ancient creature in Scottish mythology who wields magical powers and is believed to have formed Scotland's landscape has been freed after years of imprisonment in limbo. Working with Jason’s adversary Mr. Philips, a corrupt businessman who seeks only power and control, the Caillech threatens to wipe out the world in three days.

Cast 
 Chris Summers as Jason Mackenzie
 Kirsty Anderson as Lena Dwyre
 Catriona Joss as The Caillech Bheur
 John Gaffney as Superintendent Sloan
 Tam Toye as Mr Philips
 Steven McEwan as DCI Iain Mullan
 Mark Harvey as Frank Stone
 Clare Sheppard as Inspector Munro
 Simon Weir as CS Carlisle
 Nicki Fleming as Lexi
 Colin McCredie as Taylor
 Alexandra MacKenzie as Miss Jones
 Kenny Boyle as PC Douglas
 Dave Wills as Alex MacKenzie
 Elaine C. Smith as Mrs Munro
 Anna Walseth as Caitlyn
 Liz Strange as Angel
 Kelly Love as Gwen
 Vharri Lavery as Sara
 Tiger Tim Stevens as Dr Ferguson
 Eli Ghafouri as Dr Anila
 Lynne Hogan as a reporter

External links 
 
 
 Stirling Observer - news report
 Reel Scotland - interview with the director and producers
 TwoTalkingMonkeys.com

2012 films
British science fiction films
British science fiction action films
Scottish films
2010s English-language films
2010s British films